Juggernaut: Alpha is the third studio album by American progressive metal band Periphery. It's the first part of a double album, the second part of which is Juggernaut: Omega. The double album was released on January 27, 2015, by Sumerian Records. Juggernaut: Alpha debuted at No. 22 on the U.S. Billboard 200.

Critical reception 

At Metacritic, which assigns a normalized rating out of 100 to reviews from mainstream critics, the album has an average score of 84 out of 100 based on 4 reviews, indicating "universal acclaim". In a positive review for Exclaim!, Calum Slingerland wrote that "Alpha is the brighter and longer disc of the two, varied in its execution by walking a line between challenging, progressive moments and more accessible fare," citing "the soaring choruses and memorable hooks" of "Heavy Heart" and the record's title track that "highlight the group's increased incorporation of non-metal music."

Track listing

Personnel 
Writing, performance and production credits are adapted from the album liner notes.

Periphery
 Spencer Sotelo – vocals
 Misha Mansoor – guitar
 Jake Bowen – guitar
 Mark Holcomb – guitar
 Adam "Nolly" Getgood – bass
 Matt Halpern – drums

Production
 Periphery – production
 Spencer Sotelo – production (vocals only)
 Adam "Nolly" Getgood – engineering, mixing
 Taylor Larson – additional engineering (at Oceanic Recording)
 Ernie Slenkovic – additional engineering (at Oceanic Recording)
 Eric Emery – additional engineering (at Emery Recording Studios)
 Ermin Hamidovic – mastering

Artwork and design
 Justin Randall – cover illustration
 Tim Swim – additional illustration
 Daniel McBride – layout, design

Studios
 Oceanic Recording – engineering
 Emery Recording Studios – engineering
 Top Secret Audio – mixing
 Systematic Productions – mastering

Charts

References

External links 
 
 Juggernaut: Alpha at Century Media Records
 Juggernaut: Alpha at Roadrunner Records
 Juggernaut: Alpha at Sumerian Records

2015 albums
Periphery (band) albums
Sumerian Records albums
Century Media Records albums
Roadrunner Records albums
Distort Entertainment albums